Buceș is a commune in Hunedoara County, Transylvania, Romania. It is composed of seven villages: Buceș, Buceș-Vulcan, Dupăpiatră (Dupapiátra), Grohoțele, Mihăileni (Miheleny), Stănija (Sztanizsa) and Tarnița.

Gallery

References

External links

Buceş Town Hall Website 
History of Buceş 

Communes in Hunedoara County
Localities in Transylvania